The  is a four-axle Bo-Bo wheel arrangement diesel-hydraulic locomotive type operated in Japan since 1972.

Variants
A total of 65 locomotives were built between 1971 and 1975.
 Class DD16-0: 65 locomotives built between 1971 and 1975
 Class DD16-300: 4 locomotives converted from DD16-0 locomotives between 1979 and 1983 to become self-propelled snowplough units

Design
The Class DD16 was designed to replace the Class C12 and C56 steam locomotives on non-electrified rural lines where locomotives with a low axle load were required.

History
The first two locomotives, DD16 1 and 2, were built at the Japanese National Railways (JNR) Nagano factory, and these were tested on the Koumi Line and Iida Line.

Between 1979 and 1983, four locomotives (DD16 2, 5, 4, and 13) were converted at JNR's Nagano and Matto workshops to become self-propelled snowplough units, numbered DD16 301 to 304, with the addition of bogie snowplough units on either end.

With the closure of may rural lines and discontinuation of rural freight services in the 1980s, many of the class were withdrawn from operation and scrapped.

With the privatization of JNR in April 1987, just ten Class DD16 locomotives remained in service, transferred to operation by JR Group operating companies.

By 1 April 1995, seven locomotives were still in service, with four (DD16-0 and DD16-300) operated by East Japan Railway Company (JR East), two (DD16-0) operated by Kyushu Railway Company (JR Kyushu), and one (DD16-300) operated by West Japan Railway Company (JR West).

, one locomotive, DD16 11, remains in service, operated by JR East.

Preserved examples
, seven Class DD16 locomotives are preserved.
 DD16 1: Preserved at Nagano General Rolling Stock Center in Nagano
 DD16 7: Preserved in operational condition at Wakasa Station on the Wakasa Railway
 DD16 15: Preserved at the Mikasa Railway Parek in Mikasa, Hokkaido
 DD16 17: Preserved at the Otaru Museum in Otaru, Hokkaido
 DD16 31: Preserved inside the "Memorial Ship Hakkoda" in Aomori
 DD16 64: Preserved in Nōgata, Fukuoka
 DD16 303: Preserved in Nagano
 DD16 304: Preserved at the Tsuyama Railroad Educational Museum in Tsuyama, Okayama.

Classification

The DD16 classification for this locomotive type is explained below.
 D: Diesel locomotive
 D: Four driving axles
 16: Locomotive with maximum speed of 85 km/h or less

References

Diesel locomotives of Japan
DD16
DD16
DD16
Bo-Bo locomotives
1067 mm gauge locomotives of Japan
Railway locomotives introduced in 1971
Kawasaki diesel locomotives
Nippon Sharyo locomotives